Triethylphosphine is the organophosphorus compound with the formula P(CH2CH3)3, commonly abbreviated as PEt3.  It is a colorless liquid with an unpleasant odor characteristic of alkylphosphines.  The compound is a common ligand in organometallic chemistry, such as in auranofin.

Structure and simple reactions
It is a pyramidal molecule with approximate C3v symmetry. 

PEt3 is usually prepared using Grignard reagents:
 3 CH3CH2MgCl  + P(OC6H5)3  →  P(CH2CH3)3  +  3 C6H5OMgCl

PEt3 reacts with strong acids to give salts [HPEt3]X. This reaction is reversible. Similarly, it is also easily alkylated to give phosphonium derivatives. PEt3 is easily oxidised to the phosphine oxide with oxygen.

Coordination chemistry
Triethylphosphine is a highly basic ligand that forms coordination complexes with many metals.  As a ligand, triethylphosphine's Tolman cone angle is 132°.  Being a relatively compact phosphine, several can bind to a single transition metal, as illustrated by the existence of Pt(PEt3)4.  As a phosphine ligand, triethylphosphine gained acceptance earlier than did the simpler trimethylphosphine, as illustrated by the preparation of the hydride complex trans-PtHCl(PEt3)2.

Safety
PEt3 is toxic.  It converts to a low toxicity phosphine oxide upon treatment with sodium hypochlorite or hydrogen peroxide.

References

Tertiary phosphines
Foul-smelling chemicals